Shib Deraz (also Romanized as Shīb Derāz) is a village in Suza Rural District, Shahab District, Qeshm County, Hormozgan Province, Iran. At the 2006 census, its population was 461, in 93 families.

Turtle breeding  
The village is famous for its efforts to support the breeding of Hawksbill sea turtles.

References 

Populated places in Qeshm County